Jonathan Robinson (August 11, 1756November 3, 1819) was an American politician, lawyer, and judge from the state of Vermont who served as chief justice of the Vermont Supreme Court and a United States senator.

Early life
Robinson was born in Hardwick, Massachusetts on August 11, 1756, a son of Samuel Robinson (1707–1767) and Mercy (Leonard) Robinson (1714–1793). He was raised in Hardwick, and in 1761 he moved with his family to Bennington, in what would later become Vermont but was then governed as part of New Hampshire – the New Hampshire Grants. Robinson's father was an important leader in the New Hampshire Grants, and died while in England attempting to resolve a dispute over whether New Hampshire or New York had the right to grant land and town charters.

After moving to Bennington, Robinson was educated locally, then served in the militia during the American Revolution. He served as a private and corporal in the company commanded by Joseph Safford, which was part of the regiment commanded by Ebenezer Walbridge. Safford's company was mobilized in May 1779, November 1780, August 1781, and August 1782. Robinson later went into business as the proprietor of the State Arms House tavern, which was located where the Bennington Battle Monument now stands. He later decided to study law, and he was admitted to the bar in 1796.

Career
Robinson was a longtime holder of local and state office, and became identified with the Democratic-Republican Party at its founding. In addition to terms as a Bennington justice of the peace and member of the board of selectmen, among the offices in which he served were: member of the Vermont House of Representatives (1789–1796, 1797–1802, 1818–1819); Bennington town clerk (1795–1801); judge of probate for the Bennington district (1795–1798, 1800–1801, 1815–1818); and chief judge of the Vermont Supreme Court (1801–1807).

In addition to his business, legal, and political careers, Robinson was also active in the Vermont Militia; in April 1787, he was appointed a major in the militia's 1st Brigade. In August 1787, he was assigned as the brigade's judge advocate.

In each year from 1803 to 1806, Robinson was the Democratic-Republican nominee for governor, and lost each time to Isaac Tichenor. In 1807, Robinson was elected to the United States Senate, filling the unexpired term of Israel Smith, who had resigned. He was elected to a full term in 1809 and served until retiring after the end of his term in 1815.

Awards
In 1790, Robinson received the honorary degree of Bachelor of Science from Dartmouth College. In 1803, Dartmouth awarded Robinson an honorary Master of Arts.

Death and burial
Robinson died on November 3, 1819 in Bennington, Vermont. He is interred at the Old Bennington Cemetery in Bennington.

Family
Robinson was the husband of Mary (Fassett) Robinson. They were the parents of four children: Jonathan Edwards, Mary, Henry, and Isaac Tichenor. Mary Robinson was the wife of Orsamus Cook Merrill.

Robinson's brother Moses Robinson served as governor during the Vermont Republic as a U.S. senator. Brother David Robinson was a major general in the Vermont Militia and U.S. Marshal for Vermont. Brother Samuel was a colonel in the militia and served as Speaker of the Vermont House of Representatives.

Attempt to locate portrait
Robinson is one of approximately 45 U.S. senators for whom the Senate's photo historian has no likeness. Attempts to locate one have proved unsuccessful.

See also
Politics of the United States

References

External links

 
 Jonathan Robinson at The Political Graveyard
 Govtrack.us: Sen. Jonathan Robinson

1756 births
1819 deaths
Vermont state court judges
Chief Justices of the Vermont Supreme Court
Members of the Vermont House of Representatives
United States senators from Vermont
People from Hardwick, Massachusetts
Vermont lawyers
People from Bennington, Vermont
Vermont Democratic-Republicans
Democratic-Republican Party United States senators
Burials in Vermont
19th-century American lawyers